Renggam (also spelled Rengam) is a town and mukim in Kluang District, Johor, Malaysia.

Geography

The mukim spans over an area of 557 km2.

Demographics
The mukim has a total population of 47,510 people.

Transportation

The town is served by Rengam railway station.

See also
Simpang Renggam, approximately 12 km southwest

References

Mukims of Kluang District